Veerakkalpudur is a panchayat town in Salem district in the Indian state of Tamil Nadu.

Demographics
 India census, Veerakkalpudur had a population of 16,665. Males constitute 52% of the population and females 48%. Veerakkalpudur has an average literacy rate of 77%, higher than the national average of 59.5%: male literacy is 83%, and female literacy is 71%. In Veerakkalpudur, 9% of the population is under 6 years of age.

References

Cities and towns in Salem district